Fritz Glahn (March 5, 1899 – September 29, 1977) was a German politician of the Free Democratic Party (FDP) and former member of the German Bundestag.

Life 
Since 1952, Glahn was a member of the district council of the Palatinate. From 1955 to 1957 he was a member of the Rhineland-Palatinate state parliament and at the same time chairman of the FDP faction there. Glahn was a member of the German Bundestag from 1957 to 2 November 1959.

Literature

References

1899 births
1977 deaths
Members of the Bundestag for Rhineland-Palatinate
Members of the Bundestag 1957–1961
Members of the Bundestag for the Free Democratic Party (Germany)
Members of the Landtag of Rhineland-Palatinate